Stelis emarginata is a species of orchid plant and is native to Colombia, El Salvador, Guatemala, Honduras, Mexico, Nicaragua, Peru.

References 

emarginata
Flora of Colombia
Flora of El Salvador
Flora of Guatemala
Flora of Honduras
Flora of Mexico
Flora of Nicaragua
Flora of Peru